The Six Rivers National Forest is a U.S. National Forest located in the northwestern corner of California. It was established on June 3, 1947 by U.S. President Harry S. Truman from portions of Klamath, Siskiyou and Trinity National Forests. It lies in parts of four counties; in descending order of forestland area they are Del Norte, Humboldt, Trinity, and Siskiyou counties. The forest is named after the Eel, Van Duzen, Klamath, Trinity, Mad, and Smith rivers, which pass through or near the forest's boundaries.

The forest has 366 miles (589 km) of wild and scenic rivers, six distinct botanical areas, and public-use areas for camping, hiking, and fishing. The northernmost section of the forest is known as the Smith River National Recreation Area. Forest headquarters are located in Eureka, California. There are local ranger district offices in Bridgeville, Gasquet, Orleans, and Willow Creek.

Its old-growth forests include Coast Douglas-fir (Pseudotsuga menziesii var. menziesii), Tanoak (Notholithocarpus densiflorus), Pacific madrone (Arbutus menziesii), and White Fir (Abies concolor).

Wilderness areas 
There are five designated wilderness areas in Six Rivers National Forest that are part of the National Wilderness Preservation System. Two of them lie mostly in other National Forests or on Bureau of Land Management land.
 Mount Lassic Wilderness
 North Fork Wilderness
 Siskiyou Wilderness (partly in Klamath NF)
 Trinity Alps Wilderness (mostly in Trinity NF; partly in Shasta NF, Klamath NF, or on BLM land)
 Yolla Bolly-Middle Eel Wilderness (mostly in Mendocino NF; partly in Trinity NF, or BLM land)

Important events 
 The Patterson-Gimlin film, claimed to be a recording of a Bigfoot, was filmed in this national forest.
 Klamath Mountains
 Lyng v Northwest Indian Cemetery Protective Association, a 1988 US Supreme Court decision, concerned land in the forest claimed as sacred by several local Native American tribes
 In 1947 Jose Garcia, father of a then present 5-year-old Jerry Garcia, slipped on a rock while fly fishing in the Trinity River and drowned. Jerry claimed to have witnessed this happen, though others familiar with the family assert that he did not.

References

External links
 
 Official website

 
National Forests of California
Klamath Mountains
Protected areas of Del Norte County, California
Protected areas of Humboldt County, California
Protected areas of Trinity County, California
Protected areas of Siskiyou County, California
1947 establishments in California
Protected areas established in 1947